Ectromelia is a congenital condition where long bones are missing or underdeveloped. Examples include:
Amelia
Hemimelia
Phocomelia
Sirenomelia

References

External links 

Congenital disorders of musculoskeletal system